Diplopeltidae is a family of roundworms in the class Adenophorea.

Genera
There are two systems of classification of the genera of Diplopeltidae. The first divides the genera into subfamilies, while the other does not. The organisation of Diplopeltidae by subfamilies:
 Cylindrolaiminae
 Cylindrolaimus de Man, 1880
 Diplopeltinae Filipjev, 1918
 Araeolaimus de Man, 1888
 Campylaimus Cobb, 1920
 Diplopeltis Cobb, 1905
 Diplopeltula Gerlach, 1950
 Metaraeolaimoides de Conninck, 1936
 Morlaixia Vincx & Gourbault, 1988
 Pararaeolaimus Timm, 1961
 Pseudaraeolaimus Chitwood, 1951
 Southerniella Allgén, 1932
 Striatodora Timm, 1961
 Incertae subfamiliae
 Intasia Tchesunov & Miljutina, 2008
 Mudwigglus Leduc, 2013

The organisation of Diplopeltidae without subfamilies:
 Araeolaimus de Man, 1888
 Campylaimus Cobb, 1920
 Cylindrolaimus de Man, 1880
 Diplopeltula Gerlach, 1950
 Intasia Tchesunov & Miljutina, 2008
 Morlaixia Vincx & Gourbault, 1988
 Mudwigglus Leduc, 2013
 Pararaeolaimus Timm, 1961
 Southerniella Allgén, 1932
 Striatodora Timm, 1961

References 

Araeolaimida